2-Picolylamine is an organic compound with the formula H2NCH2C5H4N.  A colorless liquid, it is a common bidentate ligand and a precursor to more complex multidentate ligands such as tris(2-pyridylmethyl)amine.  It is usually prepared by hydrogenation of 2-cyanopyridine.  One such complex is Baratta's catalyst RuCl2(PPh3)2(ampy) (ampy = 2-picolylamine) for transfer hydrogenation.  Salts of the complex [Fe(pyCH2NH2)3]2+ exhibit spin crossover behavior, whereby the complex switches from high to low spin configurations, depending on the temperature.

Safety
The oral  in quail is low, being 750 mg/kg.

References

2-Pyridyl compounds
Amines